Such Hot Blood is the third studio album by American indie-rock band The Airborne Toxic Event. The album was released on April 30, 2013, by Island Records. The album debuted at number 27 on the Billboard 200 chart, in the first week of its release.  It has sold 37,000 copies in the United States as of February 2015.

It is the last album by the band to be recorded with their full original lineup with bassist Noah Harmon, who departed from the band in 2014.

Reception

Such Hot Blood received mixed to positive reviews from critics. On Metacritic, the album holds a score of 64/100 based on 4 reviews, indicating "generally favorable reviews."

"Such Hot Blood is at its best when it's at its most anthemic," argues Q. "But they have light touch too: Anna Bulbrook's deft viola shows they're not afraid of intricacy and in Mikel Jollett they have one of the great wounded vocalists," writes reviewer John Aizlewood, giving the album a 4 out of 5 star rating.

Track listing

Personnel 
 Mikel Jollett – vocals, guitar, keyboards
 Steven Chen – lead guitar, keyboards
 Anna Bulbrook – keyboards, viola, backing vocals
 Noah Harmon – bass guitar
 Daren Taylor – drums

Charts

References

2013 albums
The Airborne Toxic Event albums
Island Records albums